Scaphites is a genus of heteromorph ammonites belonging to the Scaphitidae family. They were a widespread genus that thrived during the Late Cretaceous period.

Morphology
Scaphites generally have a chambered, boat-shaped shell. The initial part (juvenile stage) of the shell is generally more or less involute (tightly coiled) and compressed, giving no hint of the heteromorphic shell form yet to come. The terminal part (adult stage) is much shorter, erect, and bends over the older shell like a hook. They have transverse, branching ribs with tubercles (small bumps) along the venter.

Reconstructions of the body within the shell can be made to portray Scaphites as either a benthic (bottom-dwelling) or planktonic animal, depending on where the center of gravity is located. Since useful fossils of the soft-body parts of cephalopods are highly rare, little is known about how this animal actually fit into its shell and lived its life.

Age
Because Scaphites and its relatives in the superfamily Scaphitoidea are restricted to certain ages of the Cretaceous (ca. 144 to 66.4 million years ago), they are useful in some areas as an index fossil. A notable example is the Late Cretaceous Western Interior Seaway in North America, in which several endemic lineages of scaphite species evolved and now serve as the basis for a highly resolved regional biostratigraphy.

Species 
 Scaphites binneyi † Reeside, 1927
 Scaphites carlilensis † Morrow, 1935
 Scaphites depressus † Reeside, 1927
 Scaphites ferronensis † Cobban, 1951
 Scaphites frontierensis † Cobban, 1951
 Scaphites hippocrepis † DeKay, 1827
 Scaphites impendicostatus † Cobban, 1951
 Scaphites leei † Reeside, 1927
 Scaphites nanus † Reeside, 1927
 Scaphites nodosus †
 Scaphites obliquus † J. Sowerby, 1813
 Scaphites preventricosus † Cobban, 1951
 Scaphites tetonensis † Cobban, 1951
 Scaphites uintensis † Cobban, 1951
 Scaphites warreni † Meek and Hayden, 1860
 Scaphites whitfieldi † Cobban, 1951

Distribution 
Fossils of Scaphites have been found in Antarctica, Armenia, Australia, Belgium, Bulgaria, Canada (Alberta, British Columbia, Northwest Territories), Denmark, France, Germany, Greenland, India, Italy, Japan, Madagascar, Mexico, New Zealand, South Africa, Spain, Sweden, Switzerland, Ukraine, the United Kingdom, and the United States (Alabama, Alaska, Arizona, California, Colorado, Delaware, Kansas, Maryland, Minnesota, Mississippi, Missouri, Montana, Nebraska, New Jersey, New Mexico, North Dakota, Oregon, South Dakota, Tennessee, Texas, Wyoming).

References

External links 
 Hypothetical reconstructions of various genera of Ancyloceratida
 Ammonoid.com
 A Biostratigraphic List of fossil Cephalopods in Utah

Ammonitida genera
Scaphitidae
Cretaceous ammonites
Ammonites of North America
Cretaceous ammonites of North America
Cretaceous Mexico
Cretaceous Europe
Cretaceous Africa
Cretaceous Asia